Enemésio Ângelo Lazzaris (12 December 1948 – 2 February 2020) was a Brazilian Roman Catholic bishop.

Lazzaris was born in Brazil and was ordained to the priesthood in 1975. He served as bishop of the Roman Catholic Diocese of Balsas, Brazil from 2008 until his death in 2020.

Notes

1948 births
2020 deaths
21st-century Roman Catholic bishops in Brazil
Roman Catholic bishops of Balsas